George de la Poer Beresford (22 April 1831 – 3 August 1906) was an Anglo-Irish Conservative politician.

Beresford was the son of the Most Reverend Marcus Beresford, Archbishop of Armagh, son of the Right Reverend George Beresford, Bishop of Kilmore and Ardagh, son of John Beresford, younger son of Marcus Beresford, 1st Earl of Tyrone. His mother was Mary, daughter of Henry Peisley L'Estrange.

He was appointed High Sheriff of Cavan for 1865. He was elected to the House of Commons for Armagh City in an 1875 by-election, a seat he held until 1885, when the constituency was abolished. In 1887, he was appointed High Sheriff of Armagh.

Beresford married Mary Annabella, daughter of Reverend William Vernon Harcourt and sister of Sir William Vernon Harcourt, in 1860. He died in August 1906, aged 75. His wife survived him by eleven years and died in July 1917.

See also
Marquess of Waterford

Notes

References

External links 
 

1831 births
1906 deaths
High Sheriffs of Cavan
High Sheriffs of Armagh
Members of the Parliament of the United Kingdom for County Armagh constituencies (1801–1922)
UK MPs 1874–1880
UK MPs 1880–1885
Irish Conservative Party MPs
George